Chikkapete is a neighborhood in Bengaluru, Karnataka, India. It is one of the city's oldest areas and is famous for its Wholesale & Retail Cloths Shops. It is near the Electric Market area in Bangalore and is a part of the Bangalore South Lok Sabha constituency. Its roots go back to the 16th century.
It is also said that Shivaji had spent early years of his childhood in Bengaluru with his father Shahaji Raje Bhosale. And his palace was there in the area which is known today as Chikkapete. Today the locality is home to the second largest Marwadi community in South india after Sowcarpet in Chennai.

See also
 Bangalore South (Lok Sabha constituency)
 Temples in Chikkapete

References

Neighbourhoods in Bangalore